Stages (Houston) is a theatre company in the city of Houston, Texas formerly known as Stages Repertory Theatre. It produces performances at The Gordy, the company's three-stage venue that opened in 2020 in Houston's Montrose neighborhood. The Houston Chronicle calls it "the equivalent of off-Broadway in Houston".

History
Stages was founded in 1978 by Founding Artistic Director Ted Swindley in the basement of a  downtown Houston brewery with a mission to "produce new work, interpret established work in new ways, and nurture talent to invigorate culture for the good of the community." Ted Swindley's vision brought success to the new theater company with a combination of long running Off Broadway hits such as "Bent" and "Sister Mary Ignatius Explains It All for You" as well as cutting edge productions of classic works such as Sartre's "No Exit" and Shakespeare's "Taming of The Shrew" presented on roller skates as an homage to underground Houston's Urban Animals. Oscar Wilde's "The Importance of Being Earnest" was SRO with two gender-bending productions performed on alternate nights. Ted's creative leadership also brought theater notables such as playwrights Jules Feiffer, Marsha Norman and Jack Heifner to Houston for World Premieres of their plays. Both the Texas Playwrights Festival and The Susan Smith Blackburn Women's Playwright Festival were conceived and launched by Ted Swindley. Stages quickly became an integral part of the Houston theater community. In 1985, Stages moved to the former Star Engraving building at 3201 Allen Parkway, which was designated a local historic landmark in 1986 through the efforts of board member Mimi Kilgore.

Stages today
Stages is a professional Equity theater and has won national recognition for its work as Houston's "maverick" theatre, including coverage in The New York Times, The Wall Street Journal, Variety, Vogue and American Theatre magazine.  Productions at Stages are created and produced  by a team of artists, performers and craftspeople largely from the Houston area, sometimes in collaboration with guest artists from around the world.

In addition, Stages introduces young audiences to live theater through its EarlyStages series. Each year, thousands of local children experience dramatic interpretations of classic folktales, stories from diverse world cultures, along with plays and musicals commissioned especially for EarlyStages.

Its current Artistic Director is Kenn McLaughlin.

References

External links
Stages Repertory Theatre

1978 establishments in Texas
Theatres in Houston
Theatre companies in Houston